= String Ting =

UK-based Mobile Accessories brand

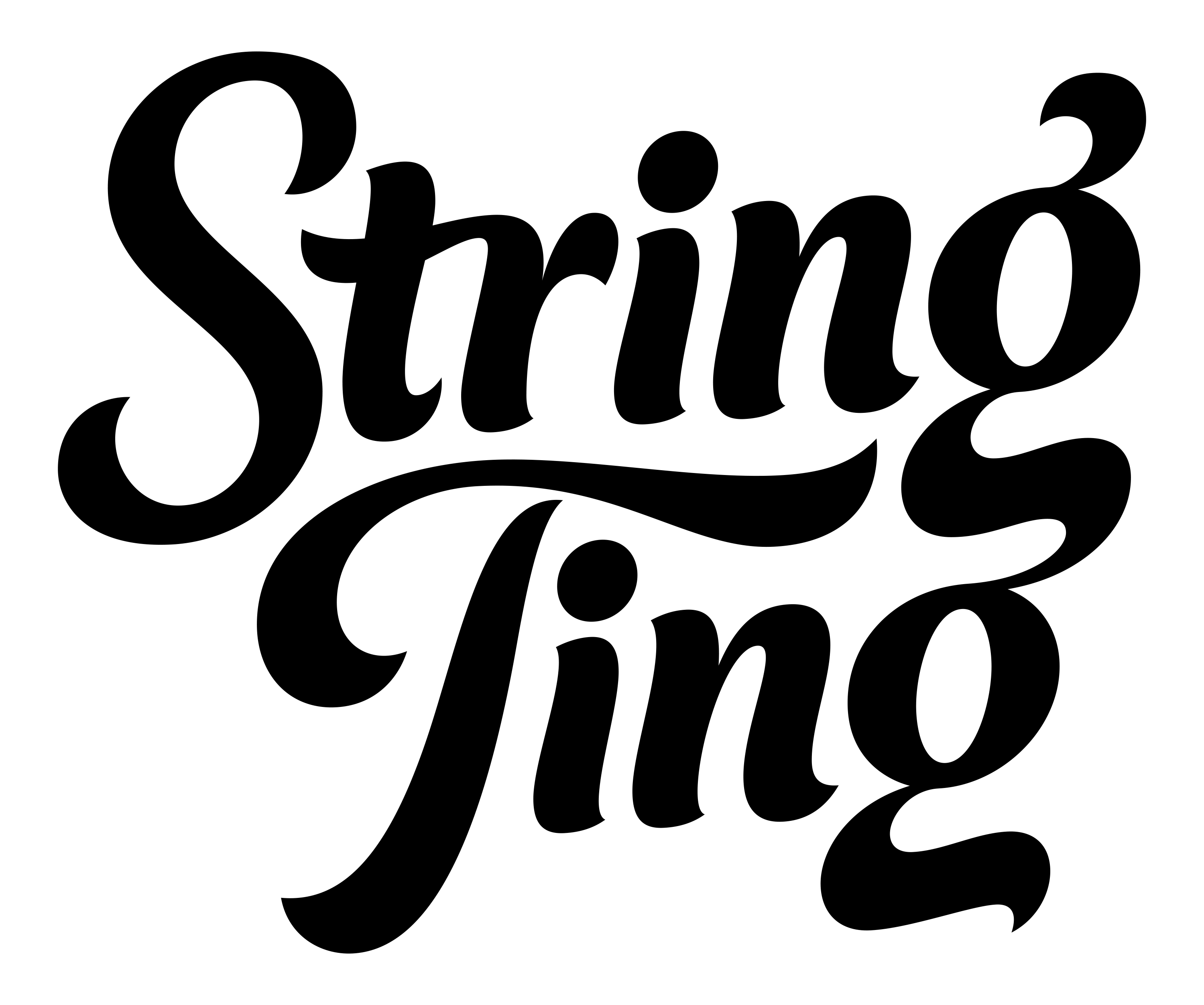
- Founded: March 2020
- Founder: Rachel Steed-Middleton
- Headquarters: London, UK
- Products: Phone straps, bag charms, keychains, brand ephemera
- Website: Official website

String Ting is an independent handmade accessories brand based in the United Kingdom.

== History ==
String Ting was founded by Rachel Steed-Middleton in 2020, at the beginning of the COVID-19 pandemic. She started the brand as a charity initiative with her children in support of NHS frontline workers and other charities delivering relief to those affected by the crisis.

== Products ==
The brand's products include handmade phone straps made from beaded wristlets.

String Ting uses luxury materials for its original designs, such as freshwater pearls, Swarovski crystals, and Japanese Miyuki beads.
